The Department of the Army Historical Advisory Committee was established in January 1947 within the United States Army. In 1996, it was made a subcommittee of the Department of Defense Historical Advisory Committee.

History
The Department of the Army Historical Advisory Committee is the oldest of the  historical advisory committees within the U.S. Department of Defense. Its antecedents were the very short-lived Advisory Board on Historical Work to the Army War College's Historical Section in 1928-1930 and, more directly, a group of three civilians and three officers, who met from May 1943 to 1946 to draft plans for the Army's history of the Second World War that led to the creation of what would become the United States Army Center of Military History.

The Secretary of the Army appoints members, which includes civilian scholars as well as those who represent the United States Military Academy, the Army War College, the Command and General Staff College, and the Training and Doctrine Command. The committee meets annually to review and to advise on the current and future plans of the United States Army Center of Military History.

Chairmen
The following, listed in chronological order, have served as chairmen of the committee. In those case where individuals have also served as individual members their names and dates are also shown separately for that service in the alphabetical list of members:

 James Phinney Baxter III, 1943–1955
 Henry Wriston, 1955–1956
 Elmer Ellis, 1957–1958
 Fred H. Harrington, 1959–1961
 Oran J. Hale, 1961–1962
 Fred C. Cole, 1963–1967
 Walter C. Langsam, 1967–1972
 Otis A. Singetary, 1972-
 Jon T. Sumida, 2003–2005

Members
 Samuel Flagg Bemis, 1955–1958
 Charles B. Burdick, 1966–1971
 Edward M. Coffman, 1971-
 Harry L. Coles, 1975-
 Henry Steele Commager, 1943–1952
 Gordon A. Craig, 1953–1958
 Elmer Ellis, 1954–1956
 William H. Emerson, 1960–1965
 James A. Field, Jr., 1963–1968
 Douglas S. Freeman, 1947–1952
 Frank Freidel, 1973-
 Oron J. Hale, 1958–1960, 1963
 E. Pendleton Herring, 1943–1952
 John D. Hicks, 1947–1954
 W. Stull Holt, 1955–1960
 William T. Hutchinson, 1947–1956
 Richard W. Leopold, 1966–1971
 S. L. A. Marshall, 1947–1954
 Ernest R. May, 1964–1969
 Louis Morton, 1968–1972
 Peter Paret, 1971-
 Forrest C. Pogue, 1969–1974
 Earl S. Pomeroy, 1960–1965
 Charles P. Roland, 1964–1969
 Theodore Ropp, 1961–1966
 E. Dwight Salmon, 1947–1952
 Charles S. Snydor, 1950–1953
 Charles H. Taylor, 1947–1952
 Frank E. Vandiver, 1969–1974
 Russell F. Weigley, 1975-
 Bell I. Wiley, 1958–1963
 T. Harry Williams, 1955–1960
 C. Vann Woodward, 1957–1962
 Walter L. Wright, 1947–1949
 James Carafano, ?-

Sources
 Richard W. Leopold, "Historians and the Federal Government: Historical Advisory Committees: State, Defense, and the Atomic Energy Commission," The Pacific Historical Review, vol. 44, No. 3. (Aug 1975), pp. 373–385.

References

 History of the United States Army
Military historiography
History organizations based in the United States